Urs Schreiber (born 1974) is a mathematician specializing in the connection between mathematics and theoretical physics (especially string theory) and currently working as a researcher at New York University Abu Dhabi. He was previously a researcher at the Czech Academy of Sciences, Institute of Mathematics, Department for Algebra, Geometry and Mathematical Physics.

Education
Schreiber obtained his doctorate from the University of Duisburg-Essen in 2005 with a thesis supervised by Robert Graham and titled From Loop Space Mechanics to Nonabelian Strings.

Work
Schreiber's research fields include the mathematical foundation of quantum field theory.

Schreiber is a co-creator of the nLab, a wiki for research mathematicians and physicists working in higher category theory.

Selected writings 
With Hisham Sati, Mathematical Foundations of Quantum Field and Perturbative String Theory, Proceedings of Symposia in Pure Mathematics, volume 83 AMS (2011)

Notes

References 
Interview of John Baez and Urs Schreiber

External links 
Home page in nLab

Category theorists
21st-century German mathematicians
Living people
1974 births
Science bloggers